Socialist Youth may refer to:

 International Union of Socialist Youth
 Scottish Socialist Youth
 Socialist German Workers Youth
 Socialist Workers Youth of Saarland
 Socialist Youth (Brazil), an organization of the Brazilian Communist Party
 Socialist Youth (Chile)
 Socialist Youth (Croatia)
 Socialist Youth (Faroe Islands)
 Socialist Youth (Ireland)
 Socialist Youth (Norway)
 Socialist Youth (Portugal)
 Socialist Youth Austria
 Socialist Youth League (Denmark, 1935)
 Socialist Youth League (Sweden)
 Socialist Youth League (United States)
 Socialist Youth League of Germany
 Socialist Youth of Spain
 Socialist Youth Union (Bulgaria)
 Unified Socialist Youth
 Workers' Youth League (Norway)
 Young European Socialists, an association of organizations in the European Union
 Socialist Youth, the newspaper of the British Labour Party Young Socialists

See also 
Social Democratic Youth (disambiguation)
Young Socialists (disambiguation)
Youth League (disambiguation)